The Eye of Night is a 2002 fantasy novel by Pauline Alama.

It is notable for including among its leading characters a dwarf called Hwyn—not the mythological race of Dwarves but the human variation of dwarfism. Hwyn is the romantic and heroic figure around whom the story turns.

Plot summary
The narrative concerns the adventures of Jereth, a self-doubting priest, and Hwyn, the young woman who protects the Eye of Night, a jewel that is connected with what appears to be an impending apocalypse. The story is woven with themes of Daoist balance and Christian Resurrection.

References 

2002 fantasy novels
2002 American novels
American fantasy novels